"Enquanto Houver Sol" is the seventeenth single by Titãs, released in 2004. The song was featured on the 2002 Rede Globo telenovela Celebridade. Malu Mader, Tony Bellotto's wife, starred as the main character. According to ABPD, it was among the 10 most played songs on the radio in 2004.

When asked if the song was inspired by "Epitáfio", the main hit from their previous record, songwriter, vocalist and keyboardist Sérgio Britto said:

In the music video for this song, the band members are seen among the dark, with images being displayed on their shirts.

Titãs Trio Acústico version 

In 2020, the band, then reduced to a trio (Branco Mello on vocals, acoustic guitar and bass; Sérgio Britto on vocal, keyboards and bass; and Tony Bellotto on vocals, acoustic and electric guitar, re-recorded the track as part of their Titãs Trio Acústico project.

The version received a video directed by Otávio Juliano and Luciana Ferraz and produced by Interface Filmes. In the video, puppets imitating the members perform the song. The puppets were created by Virgílio Zago and Guilherme Pires.

References 

2004 singles
Titãs songs
2002 songs
Songs written by Sérgio Britto